Freemasonry is a fraternal organisation that arose from the loose organization of medieval masons (i.e. stone workers) working in the medieval building industry.

History

Freemasonry in Canada traces its origins to the United Grand Lodge of England, the Grand Lodge of Scotland and the Grand Lodge of Ireland, as a result of Canada's history as a dominion within the British Empire. Freemasonry in the United States, including Prince Hall Freemasonry, also influenced the formation of Freemasonry in Canada. Erasmus James Philipps became a Freemason while working on a commission to resolve boundaries in New England and, in 1739, became provincial grand master for Nova Scotia; Philipps founded the first Masonic lodge in Canada at Annapolis Royal, Nova Scotia. The Castle Island Virtual Lodge No. 190 is an example of an internet lodge whereby meetings are conducted online rather than in person.

Masonic Fathers of Confederation

At the time of confederation in 1867, eleven men of the 37 Fathers of Confederation were Freemasons.

 Hewitt Bernard – Lawyer, Recording Secretary at the Charlottetown Conference
 Alexander Campbell – Senator (1867–1887), Lieutenant Governor of Ontario (1897–1892)
 Frederick Carter – First Premier of Newfoundland
 Edward Barron Chandler – Lieutenant Governor of New Brunswick (1878–1880)
 Alexander Tilloch Galt – Minister of Finance (1867), Founder of the North Western Coal and Navigation Company and Lethbridge, AB
 John Hamilton Gray – Premier of New Brunswick (1856–1857)
 Thomas Heath Haviland – Senator (1873–1879), Lieutenant Governor of Prince Edward Island (1879–1884)
 William Alexander Henry – Mayor of Halifax (1870–1871), Supreme Court Justice (1875–1888)
 John A. Macdonald – First Prime Minister (1867–1873, 1878–1891)
 William Henry Pope – Lawyer, Newspaper Editor, Colonial Secretary
 Samuel Leonard Tilley – Pharmacist, Premier of New Brunswick (1861–1865), Lieutenant Governor of New Brunswick (1885–1893 and 1873–1878), Originator of "Dominion" in Canada's name

Other Notable Canadian Masons

Governors
 Harold Alexander, 1st Earl Alexander of Tunis – Governor General of Canada (1946–1952)
 Lord Frederick Arthur Stanley, 16th Earl of Derby – Governor General of Canada (1888–1893), Namesake for the Stanley Cup
 John Graves Simcoe – British Army general, Founder of York (Toronto), Introduced English common law, First Lieutenant Governor of Upper Canada (1791–1796)
 Henry Cockshutt – Lieutenant Governor of Ontario (1921–1927)
 William Mulock – (Acting) Lieutenant Governor of Ontario (1931–1932), Postmaster General (1896–1905)
 John Keiller MacKay – 19th Lieutenant Governor of Ontario (1957-1963)

Politicians
 John Abbott – Prime Minister (1891–1892)
 Richard Bedford Bennett – Prime Minister (1930–1935)
 Robert Laird Borden – Prime Minister (1911–1920)
 Sir MacKenzie Bowell – Prime Minister (1894–1896)
 John Diefenbaker – Prime Minister (1957–1963)
 Thomas C. Douglas – Premier of Saskatchewan (1944–1961), Leader of New Democratic Party (1961–1971), father of Universal Healthcare, voted as The Greatest Canadian
 George Alexander Drew – Premier of Ontario (1943–1948)
 George Howard Ferguson – Premier of Ontario (1923–1930)
 Donald Methuen Fleming – Minister of Finance (1957–1962), Minister of Justice and Attorney General (1962–1963)
 Ezra Butler Eddy – Businessman, Mayor of Hull, Quebec, Member of Legislative Assembly of Quebec
 Leslie Miscampbell Frost – Premier of Ontario (1949–1961)
 Mitchell Frederick Hepburn – Youngest Premier of Ontario (1934–1942) at age 37
 Alexander Keith – Mayor of Halifax (1853–1853), President of Legislative Council of Nova Scotia (1867–1873), Founder of Alexander Keith's Brewery
 James Kirkpatrick Kerr – Lawyer, Senator (1903–1916), Speaker of the Senate (1909–1911)
 John Ross Matheson – Lawyer, Judge, MP for Leeds (1961–1968), Helped develop the maple leaf flag and the Order of Canada. 
 Nathan Phillips – Mayor of Toronto (1955–1962)
 Erasmus James Philipps – Member of the Nova Scotia Council (1730-1760) 
 Allen Bristol Aylesworth – Senator, MP for York North, Postmaster General of Canada
 George Ryerson – MPP for Toronto
 Joey Smallwood – First Premier of Newfoundland, self-dubbed "The Last Father of Confederation"
 William Grenville "Bill" Davis – 18th Premier of Ontario
 Bob Bailey – MPP for Sarnia-Lambton 

Businessmen
 Harold Ballard – Businessman and Sportsman
 Samuel Bronfman –  Businessman and Philanthropist
 John David Eaton – Businessman, Member of the Eaton family
 John Bayne Maclean – Publisher, Founder of Maclean's magazine, the Financial Post and the Maclean Publishing Company
 Colonel Samuel McLaughlin – Businessman, Philanthropist, Founder of the McLaughlin Motor Car Company
 John Molson – Businessman, Founder of Molson Brewery
 Joseph Seagram – Founder of Seagram Distilleries
 Roy Thomson, 1st Baron Thomson of Fleet – Newspaper Proprietor, Fleet Street Mogul, Namesake for Roy Thomson Hall, Appointed Knight Grand Cross of the Order of the British Empire

Military
 Major-General Malcolm Smith Mercer - Major General, The Queen's Own Rifles
Arthur William Currie – Inspector-General of the Canadian Army and vice-chancellor of McGill University
 Alexander Roberts Dunn – Soldier, awarded the Victoria Cross
 John MacGregor – (1889–1952) Born in Scotland, lived in Powell River B.C., fought in 2 world wars, awarded the Victoria Cross
 Sam Steele – Head of the RCMP Yukon detachment during the Klondike Gold Rush
 General James Wolfe – Victor in 1759 over the French at the Battle of the Plains of Abraham in Quebec
 Joseph Brant (Thayendanegea) – Six Nations Reserve Mohawk leader
 Captain Arthur Roy Brown – WWI flying ace
 Wilfrid Reid "Wop" May – WWI flying ace, final pursuit of Manfred von Richthofen
 Sir William Dillon Otter – First Canadian-born Chief of the General Staff

Science and Engineering
 Sandford Fleming – Engineer, Inventor, Founding member of the Royal Society of Canada, Founder of the Canadian Institute, Inventor of Worldwide Time Zones
 Kivas Tully – Chief Provincial Architect for Ontario (1868–1896), Imperial Service Order Recipient
 Henry Asbjørn Larsen – Arctic explorer

Sports
 Francis Michael “King” Clancy – NHL hockey player
 Charles William "The Big Bomber" Conacher, Sr. – NHL hockey player
 Norman Dawe – ice hockey and sports executive
 Hanson Dowell – ice hockey administrator and politician, Master at Ionic Lodge No. 73
 George Dudley – ice hockey administrator and lawyer
 W. A. Fry – sports administrator and newspaper publisher
 Jake Gaudaur, Jr. – CFL football player and 4th Commissioner
 W. B. George – sports administrator and agriculturalist
 Doug Grimston – ice hockey administrator
 Tim Horton – Hockey Player, Co-founder of Tim Hortons
 Atholl Layton – Professional wrestler
 Dr. James Naismith – Inventor of Basketball
 Art Potter – ice hockey administrator
 Frank Sargent – executive in ice hockey and curling
 Frederick Wellington "Cyclone" Taylor – Hockey Player
 W. F. Taylor – ice hockey administrator and dentist
 Angus James Walters – Captain of the Bluenose
 William "Whipper" John Potts – World champion professional wrestler

Clergy
 Frederick Kingston – Bishop of Diocese of Algoma (1939–1944), Primate of the Anglican Church of Canada (1947–1949)
 Most Rev. Derwyn Trevor Owen – Bishop of Niagara (1925–1932), Bishop of Toronto (1932–1934), Primate of the Anglican Church of Canada (1934–1947) 
 Clarendon Worrell – Bishop of Nova Scotia (1904–1915), Primate of the Anglican Church of Canada (1932–1934)

Arts
 Robert William Service – Writer, Author of Poems The Shooting of Dan McGrew and The Cremation of Sam McGee
 Gordon Sinclair – Journalist, Writer, Commentator, Known for The Americans
 Gwyllyn Samuel Newton "Glenn" Ford – Actor from Classical Hollywood cinema including Superman (1978)

Others
 Herbert Allan Borden Leal – Civil servant and academic
 Hon. Dana H. Porter – Chief Justice of the Court of Appeal for Ontario
 Dr. Edward Earle Shouldice
 Robert Butchart
 Kenneth Jewell Colpoys Dunstan

Masonic buildings in Canada

Grand Lodge of Canada in the Province of Ontario, King Street West, Hamilton, Ontario
Toronto, Ontario
Toronto Masonic Temple, 888 Yonge Street. No longer affiliated with Freemasonry
West Toronto Masonic Temple - 151 Annette Street West
Masonic Hall, 2 Gloucester St, Toronto. Residential
Masonic Lodge, Red River Road, Thunder Bay, ON
Belrock Masonic Centre, 845 – Regent St, Sudbury, ON
Masonic Temple (St. John's, Newfoundland and Labrador)
Montreal Masonic Memorial Temple, Montreal, QC
St. Mark's Masonic Lodge, Baddeck, NS
Masonic Memorial Temple, 420 Corydon Avenue, Winnipeg, MB
Freemason's Hall, Halifax, NS
St. Mark's Lodge #118, 2612 – 14A St. SW, Calgary, AB
Edmonton, Alberta:
Freemasons' Hall, 10318 – 100 Avenue, Edmonton, AB
 Masonic Hall, 10433 83rd Avenue, Edmonton, AB
 Highlands Masonic Hall, 5526 118 Avenue, Edmonton, AB
 Masonic Hall, Fort Edmonton Park, Edmonton, AB

Governing bodies
There is a number of various supreme organisations (Grand Lodges, National Lodges, Grand Orients, and Federations) active in Canada representing a number of regularity / amity networks along with a number of independent lodges. 

Membership numbers could be overstated, as membership in multiple lodges is actively encouraged.

There appears to be a number of other supreme bodies in the country, including Grand Orient de France Amerique du Nord, Obédience Mixte Nord-Américaine: George Washington Union, Grand Orient du Canada, Grande Loge Autonome du Québec, Grande Loge Mixte du Québec, but the information on them is not readily available.

The Grand Lodge of Scotland has a District Grand Lodge of Newfoundland and Labrador responsible for 11 lodges.

The Grand Lodge of Alberta also includes the Northwest Territories, particularly a lodge in Yellowknife, although there used to be a lodge in Inuvik in the 2000s (Far North Lodge).

See also

List of Freemasons
Freemasonry

References

External links
 Prince Hall Grand Lodge Free and Accepted Masons Province of Ontario and Jurisdiction
 Grande Loge du Québec
 Grand Lodge of Nova Scotia
 Grand Lodge of New Brunswick
 Grand Lodge of Saskatchewan
 Grand Lodge of British Columbia and Yukon
 Grand Lodge of Alberta
 Grande Loge ANI du Canada
 Fédération canadienne du Droit Humain
 Grand Orient du Québec
 Grande Loge Nationale du Canada
 Gran Logia de Lengua Española de Canada
 Grand Orient de France Amerique du Nord 
 Obédience Mixte Nord-Américaine : George Washington Union 
 Grand Orient du Canada 
 Grande Loge Autonome du Québec
 Grande Loge Mixte du Québec